"Mask Off" is a song by American rapper Future for his eponymous fifth studio album Future (2017). The track was later released as the second single after initially charting as an album track and receiving more popularity than the lead single "Draco". It was Future's highest-charting single, peaking at number five on the US Billboard Hot 100, until the releases of "Life Is Good" (2020), "Way 2 Sexy" (2021), and "Wait For U" (2022), with the former peaking at number two, and the latter two peaking at number one.

Composition
Composed in D minor, the song samples "Prison Song" by Carlton Williams, released in 1978 as part of his musical Selma. In this track, Future opens up about drug use and addiction problems (Percocets, Molly Percocets). It also tells a story that explores the surface of Future's past, from trapping to living a life of luxury.

Chart performance
"Mask Off" peaked at number five on the US Billboard Hot 100 for the week of May 6, 2017, becoming his first top-five charting single on that chart. It also peaked in the top 10 in New Zealand, Sweden, Denmark, Switzerland, Canada and France, where it charted the highest at number two. It has since been certified eight times platinum by the Recording Industry Association of America (RIAA) for combined sales and streaming equivalent units of over eight million units in the United States.

Music video
The music video for "Mask Off" was released on May 5, 2017. It was directed by Colin Tilley. It features appearances from Amber Rose and DJ Esco.

Live performances and remixes
The official remix features a guest appearance from American rapper Kendrick Lamar and was mixed by engineer Alex Tumay, released on May 23, 2017. Its release follows the performance of "Mask Off" by Future alongside Kendrick Lamar at the 2017 Coachella Festival. Lamar has performed live covers of "Mask Off" at every show on the Damn Tour since the release of the remix.

Fellow rapper Joyner Lucas has released his own remix onto SoundCloud and YouTube. On the remix, he sent shots at rappers Logic and Lil Yachty.

On June 16, 2017, a remix produced by Marshmello was released. Marshmello's fans have deemed the remix ironic as the DJ is known for masking his identity behind a marshmallow-inspired helmet.

Track listing

Charts

Weekly charts

Year-end charts

Certifications

Release history

Legacy 
 The song was used in the Brooklyn Nine-Nine episode Return to Skyfire. 
 The song was used in the Rick and Morty episode Claw and Hoarder: Special Ricktim's Morty.
During the COVID-19 pandemic, the song experienced a resurgence, especially due to the lyrics in the chorus, "Mask on, fuck it, mask off." Future and the FreeWishes Foundation announced the "Mask On" campaign and provided more than 100,000 masks during the pandemic. 
The city of Inglewood created a COVID-19 "Mask On" PSA in 2020 to encourage people to wear protective masks during the coronavirus pandemic.

See also
 List of number-one urban singles of 2017 (Australia)
 List of Billboard Hot 100 top 10 singles in 2017

References

2017 songs
2017 singles
Future (rapper) songs
Songs written by Future (rapper)
Songs written by Metro Boomin
Song recordings produced by Metro Boomin
Music videos directed by Colin Tilley
Epic Records singles